Three Mile Bush is a suburb of Whangarei in Northland, New Zealand.

The population of Three Mile Bush was 999 in the 2013 Census, an increase of 350 from 2006.

References 

Suburbs of Whangārei